Setterstrom is a surname. Notable people with this surname include:
 Chad Setterstrom (born 1984), American football player
 Mark Setterstrom (born 1984), American football player